My Girl Tisa is a 1948 film directed by Elliott Nugent and starring Lilli Palmer and Sam Wanamaker. It is based on the play Ever the Beginning by Lucille S. Prumbs and Sara B. Smith (copyrighted 14 May 1946).

Plot
In 1905, Tisa Kepes is an immigrant who is living in a New York City boarding house and struggling to make ends meet, making very little money working for a Mr. Grumbach in the garment district. An aspiring lawyer, Mark Denek, also is a boarder there, dreaming of someday meeting his idol, President Teddy Roosevelt.

Tisa is trying to earn enough to pay for her father's boat passage so he can join her in America. In an attempt to assist her, Mark loses his job with a politician, Dugan, is double-crossed by a ship captain named Tescu who intends to make Tisa's father work for him, then ends up getting Tisa slated for deportation. In love with Tisa and desperate, Mark has a chance encounter with Roosevelt, who intervenes at the last instant on their behalf.

Cast
Lilli Palmer as Tisa Kepes 
Sam Wanamaker as Mark Denek
Akim Tamiroff as Mr. Grumbach
Alan Hale, Sr. as Dugan
Hugo Haas as Tescu
Gale Robbins as Jenny Kepes 
John Qualen as Svenson
Sidney Blackmer as Theodore Roosevelt 
Fritz Feld as Prof. Tabor 
John Banner as Otto 
Hobart Cavanaugh as Sigmund (uncredited) 
Charles Middleton as Examiner (uncredited) 
Ivan F. Simpson as Old Man (uncredited)
Jack Mower as Postman (uncredited)

References

External links

 

1948 films
Films directed by Elliott Nugent
Warner Bros. films
Films about immigration to the United States
Films set in the 1900s
American mystery drama films
1940s mystery drama films
American black-and-white films
1948 drama films
1940s American films